The following is a list of county roads in Lee County, Florida, United States. As with most Florida counties, numbers are assigned in a statewide grid. Many roads are former state roads that have been truncated or eliminated.

County Road 78

County Road 78 exists in two sections that were both formerly State Road 78. The western section runs along Pine Island Road from SR 78 / CR 765 / CR 884 in Cape Coral to CR 767 in Pine Island Center, and the eastern section runs along North River Road from SR 31 in North Fort Myers to the Hendry County line in Alva, continuing east as County Road 78.

The entire route was once formerly SR 78.

County Road 78A

County Road 78A is Pondella Road from SR 78 in Cape Coral to U.S. Route 41 Business in North Fort Myers.  It provides a quicker way for motorists traveling east on SR 78 to access Downtown Fort Myers. The road was known as SR 78A before 1980.

County Road 765

County Road 765 is Burnt Store Road from SR 78 / CR 78 / CR 884 in Cape Coral to the Charlotte County line in Burnt Store Marina. The road continues north into Charlotte County and serves as a direct connection between Cape Coral and Punta Gorda.  The road was formerly known as SR 765.

The road is named after the community of Burnt Store Marina, whose name refers to a general store and trading post operated by early settlers that once stood in the general vicinity. The trading post was burned down by a small group of Seminole Indians led by Chief Billy Bowlegs in protest of settlers taking their land.

Major intersections

County Road 767

County Road 767 is Stringfellow Road (also known as Pine Island Boulevard) from York Street in St. James City to Main Street in Bokeelia. The entire route is on Pine Island.  The road was formerly known as SR 767.

The road is named for Harry Stringfellow, a Lee County commissioner from Pine Island who served from 1926 to 1953.  He played a major role in the construction of the road and the Matlacha Bridge.

Major intersections

County Road 771
Unsigned CR 771, formerly part of SR 771, is Gasparilla Road extending north from Boca Grande to the Charlotte County line on Gasparilla Island.

County Road 810

County Road 810 exists along Luckett Road from CR 865 (Ortiz Avenue) in Fort Myers to Country Lakes Drive west of Buckingham.

The road is maintained by the Lee County DOT, except for the interchange with I-75, which is maintained by Florida DOT.

Major intersections

County Road 840

County Road 840 is Alico Road from US 41 (Tamiami Trail) just west of San Carlos Park to CR 850 (Corkscrew Road) east of Estero.  It mostly runs in an east-west trajectory just north of San Carlos Park and Three Oaks, providing access to Florida Gulf Coast University, Gulf Coast Town Center, and Southwest Florida International Airport. The road is maintained by the Lee County DOT, except for the I-75 interchange, which is maintained by Florida DOT.

History
It originally was a two-lane rural road connecting the Tamiami Trail to agricultural and industrial land owned by the Atlantic Land and Improvement Company (later known as Alico, Inc., the road's namesake) in east Lee County. In 1973, a railroad spur was built along Alico Road to serve mines on Alico's land, although the easternmost 3.5 miles of it were removed in 1994.

Alico Road has since become a major commuter thoroughfare. In the mid- to late 2000s it was widened to six lanes, and the interchange with I-75 was rebuilt as a partial cloverleaf interchange (it was originally a folded diamond due to the railroad). In 2007, the west end and the terminus at US 41 was realigned slightly north in preparation for the construction of the SR 739 extension and interchange (which was built in 2012).

Major intersections

County Road 850

County Road 850 is Corkscrew Road from US 41 (Tamiami Trail) in Estero to the Collier County line near Immokalee, where it continues east into Collier County towards Immokalee.  East of Estero, it runs just to the north of Corkscrew Swamp.

The route was first commissioned as a state road in 1935 with the designation State Road 276.  It became SR 850 ten years later during the 1945 Florida State Road renumbering. It was then transferred to Lee County control in the 1980s.  All of CR 850 is maintained by Lee County DOT, except for the interchange with I-75, which is maintained by Florida DOT.

Major intersections

County Road 863

County Road 863 is the county-controlled segment of Fowler Street south of Metro Parkway within the city limits of Fort Myers. North of here, Fowler is designated State Road 739, which continues south along Metro Parkway.

The unsigned designation follows Fowler Street from Metro Parkway south and intersects State Road 884 (Colonial Boulevard). It then turns southwest and winds around one of the runways at Page Field before terminating at US 41.

Fowler Street previously terminated at North Airport Road at the entrance to the former passenger terminal at Page Field (which ceased operations in 1983 when commercial air service was relocated to Southwest Florida International Airport). In the mid-1990s, Fowler Street was realigned around Page Field's Runway 13 and extended to connect directly to US 41 at Boy Scout Drive (which continues a short distance to Summerlin Road (CR 869)).

Prior to the fall of 2015, CR 863's designation ended at Hanson Street (which previously carried the SR 739 designation to Metro Parkway's former alignment).

Major intersections
The entire route is in Fort Myers.

County Road 865

County Road 865 exists in three sections. The southernmost section begins in Bonita Springs where it is known as Bonita Beach Road, the main east-west route through Bonita Springs.  When it reaches the Gulf of Mexico near Barefoot Beach, it turns north along Hickory Boulevard.  It becomes Estero Boulevard as it crosses the Bonita Beach Causeway onto Fort Myers Beach.  This section ends at the north end of Fort Myers Beach at SR 865 just south of the Matanzas Pass Bridge.

The central section travels along Gladiolus Drive through Iona, Harlem Heights, and Biggar and passes Lakes Regional Park before ending at US 41 (Tamiami Trail).

The northern section runs along Ben C. Pratt Six Mile Cypress Parkway  and Ortiz Avenue from SR 739 to SR 80 in Tice.

The segments were once part of a continuous SR 865 and Ortiz Avenue was part of SR 80B.

County Road 867

County Road 867 is McGregor Boulevard from the Sanibel Causeway in Punta Rassa to SR 867 in Iona.

The road was formerly known as SR 867, a designation which still exists on a section of McGregor Boulevard from Iona to McGregor.

County Road 867A

County Road 867A is the main north-south route through Cape Coral, connecting it with North Fort Myers and South Fort Myers.

It begins just south of Fort Myers at US 41 near Villas.  From here, it is known as College Parkway, named for its proximity to Florida SouthWestern State College (originally Edison Community College).

Up to this point, it is unsigned, though a part of College Parkway near Summerlin Road is signed as CR 882. At Cape Coral Parkway's interchange with Del Prado Boulevard, the route turns north along the street, and is first signed as CR 867A here. The route continues north through much of Cape Coral. Veterans Parkway is one of Cape Coral's major east–west routes, and it travels into Fort Myers via the Midpoint Memorial Bridge. Del Prado Boulevard continues northward to Pine Island Road (SR 78).

North of Pine Island Road, addresses on Del Prado Boulevard have the attached "North" suffix to the name of the road; south of Pine Island Road uses "South." After Pine Island Road, Del Prado Boulevard continues north as a city street, though the city of Cape Coral maintains the CR 867A designation.  It intersects Diplomat Parkway and the Kismet Parkway, before intersecting with US 41 (Tamiami Trail) at the northern Cape Coral city limits.  The extension into North Fort Myers was built in the 1990s.

From US 41, Del Prado Boulevard once again becomes a county road and continues east along the northern edge of North Fort Myers.  Just past the Prairie Pines Preserve, it briefly becomes Mellow Drive before it terminates at Slater Road.  Future plans call for Del Prado Boulevard to be extended north from Mellow Drive in North Fort Myers around the Prairie Pines Preserve to Interstate 75 with a new interchange near the Lee-Charlotte County border.

Formerly State Road 867A between McGregor Boulevard and Pine Island Road, it became a major route when the Cape Coral Bridge opened in 1964.

County Road 869

County Road 869 is the designation for Summerlin Road which runs from CR 867 (McGregor Boulevard) in Iona east and north to CR 884 (Colonial Boulevard) in Fort Myers.  It is the main route connecting Fort Myers with the islands of Fort Myers Beach, Sanibel and Captiva.  The road is named for Jacob Summerlin, a prominent Punta Rassa cattleman.

Built in the early 1980s, Summerlin Road was planned to be part of State Road 869 (a designation which has since been reused for the Sawgrass Expressway near Fort Lauderdale), but the road was never added to the state highway system since it turned over to Lee County before it opened.  It was originally intended to be an alternative to McGregor Boulevard (SR 867) as a limited-access road, but development along the route has since hindered that intent.  To better handle increasing traffic, the intersection with San Carlos Bouelvard (SR 865) was upgraded to an interchange in 2007 along with being widened to six lanes.  Elevated interchange ramps were also added at the Gladiolus Drive (CR 865) intersection at the same time.  The College Parkway (CR 867A) intersection was upgraded to an interchange in 2011 along with further widening.

South of Fort Myers, Summerlin Road roughly follows the route of the abandoned Punta Rassa branch of the Seaboard Air Line Railroad, which was removed in 1952.  It runs along the former railroad corridor from just north of Gladiolus Drive to Bass Road.

Major intersections

County Road 876

County Road 876 serves as a major east-west thoroughfare through Lee County just south of Fort Myers city limits before becoming a north-south route through Lehigh Acres and Buckingham.  Beginning at  SR 867 in McGregor, CR 876 travels east along Cypress Lake Drive through Cypress Lake to U.S. Route 41 (Tamiami Trail).  It continues east of US 41 as Daniels Parkway towards Interstate 75 and Southwest Florida International Airport.  East of Gateway, CR 876 intersects State Road 82, where it turns north and continues as Gunnery Road through Lehigh Acres before merging with Buckingham Road. Buckingham Road carries CR 876 north through Buckingham to its terminus with SR 80 in Fort Myers Shores.

County Road 881

County Road 881 exists just west of Interstate 75 from the Collier County line in Bonita Springs to CR 840 (Alico Road) in Three Oaks.  Locally, it is known as Three Oaks Parkway north of Coconut Road in Estero, and Imperial Parkway south of this point.  The road continues past its southern terminus into Collier County as County Road 881, which is known as Livingston Road.  The entire route is controlled by Lee County, except for the short segment between Bonita Beach Road and East Terry Street which is controlled by the city of Bonita Springs (though the city maintains the CR 881 designation).

The corridor of CR 881 in Lee County was completed in early 2008 with the opening of Imperial Parkway between Coconut Road in Estero and East Terry Street in Bonita Springs.  This made CR 881 a third major thoroughfare connecting Lee and Collier Counties along with U.S. Route 41 and Interstate 75.

Lee County plans to eventually extend Three Oaks Parkway north of its current terminus to Daniels Parkway (CR 876).  A short segment of the extension was built by a private developer in the early 2010s.  The rest of the extension, which would parallel Interstate 75 and connect to Daniels Parkway via Fiddlesticks Boulevard, is set to be completed around 2020.

Major intersections

County Road 884

County Road 884 exists in two sections. The western section runs through Cape Coral along the Veterans Parkway and the Midpoint Bridge from SR 78 / CR 78 (Pine Island Road) / CR 765 (Burnt Store Road) in Cape Coral to SR 884 / US 41 (Cleveland Avenue) in Fort Myers. The eastern section travels through Lehigh Acres along Colonial, Lee, Leeland Heights, and Joel Boulevards from SR 884 / Dynasty Drive in Fort Myers to SR 80 in Alva.

The eastern segment came into existence in the early 1980s when Colonial Boulevard (SR 884) was extended from I-75 to connect with State Road 82 at Lee Boulevard.  Lee Boulevard was previously State Road 82B while Leeland Heights and Joel Boulevards were part of State Road 873 (a designation which also continued south down Alabama Road).

The western segment, which previously ended at State Road 867 (McGregor Boulevard), was extended into Cape Coral in 1997 upon the completion of the Midpoint Memorial Bridge and Veterans Parkway.

County Road 885

County Road 885 lies just east of Interstate 75 from CR 850 (Corkscrew Road) in Estero to CR 884 (Colonial Boulevard) in Fort Myers.  As a major north-south corridor, it provides access to Florida Gulf Coast University, Gulf Coast Town Center, and Southwest Florida International Airport.  It is known as Treeline Avenue north of the entrance to Southwest Florida International Airport, and Ben Hill Griffin Parkway south of it.

History
The first major segment of CR 885 to be completed was Ben Hill Griffin Parkway between Alico and Corkscrew Roads.  It was named for Ben Hill Griffin, Jr., former chairman of Alico Inc., whose land was partially donated by Griffin's son Ben Hill Griffin III to the state for the construction of Florida Gulf Coast University.  Ben Hill Griffin Parkway was completed by 1997 in conjunction with the opening of the university, as it was the main access road.

Treeline Avenue, which originally was a short local road off Daniels Parkway, was extended south and connected to Ben Hill Griffin Parkway in early 2005 in conjunction with the opening of the current terminal at Southwest Florida International Airport.  Treeline Avenue was later extended to Colonial Boulevard in 2006.

Major intersections

County Road 887

County Road 887 is the unsigned designation for Old 41 Road from the Collier County line north through Bonita Springs to US 41.

The road was originally a routing of Tamiami Trail (US 41) through Downtown Bonita Springs.  It became SR 887 when US 41 was moved to its present alignment in 1976.  It was turned over to Lee County in the early 1980s.  Bonita Springs was incorporated in 1999, and CR 887 has since come under city control.

The SR 887 designation has since been reused for the Port Miami Tunnel since its opening on August 3, 2014.

Major intersections
The entire route is in Bonita Springs.

County Road 901

County Road 901 (CR 901) is the unsigned designation for Vanderbilt Drive from the Collier County line north, along the Collier–Lee county line for its entire length, into Bonita Springs to CR 865.

Major intersections
The entire route is in Bonita Springs, on the Collier–Lee county line.

See also
 Former state roads in Florida

References

 
County